The  is a Japanese art museum and regarded as one of the best ceramic-collections in the world. This museum collects, studies, conserves, exhibits and interprets East Asian ceramics, which mainly came from ancient China and Korea.  The world-famous Ataka Collection, donated by the 21 companies of the Sumitomo Group, as well as the Rhee Byung-Chang Collection, provide the public an aesthetic experience with first-class collection.

Collection

National Treasures 
 Celadon vase with Iron Brown Spots
 Tenmoku Glaze bowl with Silvery Spots

Important Cultural Properties 
 Stoneware with Sgraffito Decoration of Peony with Transparent Glaze under Green Glaze
 Porcelain with Carved Lotus Design
 Porcelain with Incised Peony Scrolls Design Cut through Underglaze Iron-Coating
 Celadon with Carved Peony Scrolls Design
 Celadon vase with phoenix handles
 Tenmoku Glaze bowl with Leaf Design
 Blue-and-White with Fish and Water Plants Design
 Blue-and-White with Peony Scrolls Design
 Blue-and-White with Bird and Branch Design

Notes

External links 

Nakanoshima
Art museums and galleries in Osaka
Ceramics museums in Japan
Art museums established in 1982
1982 establishments in Japan